Edward Robert is a compound given name. Notable people with the name include

 Edward Robert Armstrong (1876–1955), Canadian-born engineer and inventor
 Edward Robert Bulwer-Lytton, 1st Earl of Lytton (1831–1891), English statesman and poet
 Edward Robert Festing (1839–1912), English army officer, chemist, and first Director of the Science Museum
 Edward Robert Harrison (1919–2007), British astronomer and cosmologist
 Edward Robert Hughes (1851–1914), English painter
 Edward Robert King-Harman (1838–1888), Irish landlord, Irish Nationalist and Unionist politician
 Edward Robert Peacock (1871–1962), Canadian merchant banker
 Edward Robert Robson (1836–1917), English architect
 Edward Robert Sellstrom (1916–1942), American Naval aviator
 Edward Robert Sullivan (1826–1899), 5th Baronet of Thames Ditton
 Edward Robert Tregear (1846–1931), New Zealand public servant and scholar

See also
 Ed Roberts (disambiguation)
 Edward Roberts (disambiguation)